"Castro" is a song by American rapper Yo Gotti featuring fellow American rappers Kanye West, Big Sean, 2 Chainz, and Quavo. It was released on December 16, 2016 as a single from Gotti's 2016 mixtape White Friday (CM9).

Background
The song's title is a reference to Cuban leader Fidel Castro, who died within the same month of its release. Prior to "Castro" being released, West was with Gotti in Los Angeles when premiering his "Saint Pablo" record.

Critical reception
Tom Breihan of Stereogum described the track as 'a skittery, synthetic banger' and showed disappointment in West's feature when writing: 'Does a song like this make you feel any better about Kanye West right now? It doesn't make me feel any better about Kanye West.' The FADER's Will Bundy branded it as 'a monster posse cut'.

Commercial performance
"Castro" charted at number 16 on the US Billboard Bubbling Under Hot 100 on January 14, 2017, around a month after having been released as a single.

Charts

Release history

References

2016 singles
2016 songs
Yo Gotti songs
Kanye West songs
Big Sean songs
2 Chainz songs
Quavo songs
Songs written by Yo Gotti
Songs written by Kanye West
Songs written by Big Sean
Songs written by 2 Chainz
Songs written by Quavo
Works about Fidel Castro
Songs written by Ben Billions